The 1950 Tennessee Volunteers football team represented the University of Tennessee in the 1950 college football season.  Led by head coach Robert Neyland, the Volunteers lost only one game, a 7–0 upset at Mississippi State  in the second game of the season.  The Vols handed #3 Kentucky, coached by Bear Bryant, its only loss and defeated #3 Texas in the Cotton Bowl Classic en route to an 11–1 record.

Big Seven champion Oklahoma finished the regular season 10–0 and was named national champions by the AP Poll, but lost to Kentucky, whom Tennessee earlier defeated, in the Sugar Bowl.  Tennessee was the only top five team that year to win their bowl game.  Tennessee was named national champion by NCAA-designated major selectors of Billingsley, DeVold, Dunkel, College Football Researchers Association, and National Championship Foundation, while named co-champion by Sagarin (ELO-Chess).

Prominent players
The 1950 Tennessee team featured Hank Lauricella, the following season's Heisman Trophy runner-up, and Doug Atkins, a future member of both the College Football Hall of Fame and the Pro Football Hall of Fame.  In addition, guard Ted Daffer and tackle Bill "Pug" Pearman were named as All-Americans in 1950.

Schedule

References

Tennessee
Tennessee Volunteers football seasons
College football national champions
Cotton Bowl Classic champion seasons
Tennessee Volunteers football